Huang Zhiyi (Chinese:黄志毅) (born February 3, 1981) is a Chinese footballer, who currently plays for Hoi Fan.

Honours
Guangzhou F.C.
China League One: 2007, 2010

References

External links
 Player profile at sports.sohu.com (Chinese)

1981 births
Living people
Footballers from Guangzhou
Chinese footballers
Guangzhou F.C. players
Expatriate footballers in Macau
Association football defenders